This article lists British companies and charitable organisations that have participated in the British government's workfare programmes whereby individuals must work in return for unemployment benefits. Note that several companies, charities, public sector and third sector organisations have pulled out of workfare schemes as a result of negative publicity and as such inclusion on this list does not mean that a company currently uses workfare. Those involved in a specific version of workfare where this is known, have it listed after their names, while those known to have withdrawn altogether as of May 2019, are denoted by Withdrawn.

Help to Work was discontinued in stages in 2016 and 2017. "Traineeships" targeted unemployed young people.

Freedom of Information challenge

Attempts to get the names of companies and charities who have participated in workfare have been the subject of a lengthy legal battle.
In May 2013 the DWP lost a first tier tribunal case where it was ruled that the names of those who have participated in Mandatory Work Activity schemes should be released. 
The fourth and final Appeal lodged by the DWP was thrown out in July 2016 and the lists of "placement providers" for the now defunct scheme Mandatory Work Activity revealed the names of 534 organisations.

Boycott Workfare list
The anti-workfare organisation Boycott Workfare has compiled its own list of organisations that are known to have participated in DWP workfare schemes. "Defunct" denotes that a company has been liquidated and no longer exists having gone bankrupt and been dissolved, this includes "social enterprises" which are still commercial money-making enterprises.

4 Acres
A19 Skills (Swansea) 
Aberdeen Foyer - involved with Help to Work
A4e
The AA
Abney Park Cemetery
Accident Helpline
Acorns Children's Hospice Charity Shop (Worcester) - Mandatory Work Activity
Acorn Computer Recycling - defunct
Acorn Training (East Midlands) - G4S subcontractor in Help to Work
Acorn Training Consultants (East Midlands) - G4S subcontractor in Help to Work
Action for Blind People - Work Programme
A-Class Football Foundation
ACT Learnabout (Wales) - G4S subcontractor in Help to Work
Acumen (North East) - G4S subcontractor in Help to Work
Affinity Sutton
Age UK - withdrew from Mandatory Work Activity in 2012, but remain involved with other variants of workfare including Traineeships; have stated that they will not be participants in Help to Work
AIM2LEARN
Air Hop Bristol
All Waste Recycling & Hire Ltd - defunct
Alpha Stream - defunct
Armada Tube and Steel - defunct
Anglo-Chinese Arts Council
Anna's Charity - defunct
Angus College - Mandatory Work Activity
Ardgour Riding Centre (Kilmalieu, Inverness)
Arabic Career Development 
Argos - withdrawn
Argyle & Bute Council - Mandatory Work Activity
AS Care (Leicester) - involved with Traineeships
Assist Recruitment - defunct
Asda
Asian Star Community Radio LTD
Aspire Foundation
Atlas Washrooms Systems
ATN Adult Training Network (East London) - G4S subcontractor
ATS
Avanta - Mandatory Work Activity
Avanta Enterprise Ltd - Mandatory Work Activity
Awaiting Eyes Foundation (London) - defunct
Babington (East Midlands) - involved with Help to Work
Balsall Heath Forum - involved with Help to Work
BAM Facility Management
Barakah Mini Market - defunct
Barnardos - Mandatory Work Activity, claim to no longer be involved with Help to Work
Barnsley Hospice
Bath Antiques
Beaumont Leys Primary School  (Leicester) - involved with Traineeships the latest variant of workfare targeting unemployed people
Beaumont Leys & Stocking Farm Sure Start Children's Centre (Leicester) - involved with Traineeships
Bedesworld<ref name - defunct
BEST, Business Employment Training Services Ltd (Yorkshire & Humber) - Mandatory Work Activity
Bellcome Call Centre - defunct
Bethany Training - subcontractor in Help to Work
Bexley Council (Resources Plus) - G4S subcontractor in Help to Work
BHS (British Home Stores) - withdrawn
Birmingham Community Development Scheme
Blue Cross - withdrawn; have stated that they will not be participants in Help to Work
Blue Arrow
Bluebird Care
B & M Stores - involved in Traineeships
Bobath Children's Therapy Centre, Wales -  subcontractor in Help to Work
The Body Shop - withdrawn
Booker Wholesale
Books for Free (Basildon)- defunct
Boots - withdrawn
Bootstrap (Merseyside, Lancashire & Cumbria) - G4S subcontractor in Help to Work
Bournemouth City Council
Bowden Derra Care Home
B&Q
Brantano Footwear (Leicester) - defunct
Bridge to Success - defunct
Bristol Auto Electric
British Heart Foundation - withdrew from Mandatory Work Activity and the Work Programme in 2012, but still involved in Work Experience variant of workfare as of 2014, and involved with other variants of workfare including Traineeships; have stated that they will not be participants in Help to Work
Bromford Group (Wolverhampton) - withdrawn
Broadway - formerly Work Programme subcontractors before merger with St Mungos resulted in the end of involvement, so now withdrawn
BT
Brothers of Charity Services England - involved with Help to Work
BTCV - Mandatory Work Activity
Building and Property Maintenance
Bulky Bob's - withdrawn from Help to Work
Burger King – withdrawn
Burtons Biscuits (Edinburgh)
Burton
Business2Business Ltd - defunct
Butlins Ltd - involved with Traineeships
Byteback It Solutions Limited (Bristol) - withdrawn, had been involved in Help to Work
Calico Group (Pennine Lancashire)
Calderdale Council - involved with Traineeships
Campbell Page UK 
Cancer Research UK - withdrew from Mandatory Work Activity and the Work Programme in 2012, but still involved in Work Experience as of 2014 and involved in Traineeships; have stated that they will not be participants in Help to Work
Candyland formerly Tangerine Confectionery - Marks & Spencer supplier
Care UK
Carefree Kids
Caremark
Carillion (Kent) - defunct
Carnegie Heritage Centre (Hull)
Cartrefi Conwy - involved with Help to Work
Cats Protection
CCL North Recycling (Irvine)
Carnegie College - Mandatory Work Activity
Central Beds Council
Centre for Design & Manufacture UK Ltd (London) - defunct
CEX (Bristol)
Child Dynamix (Hull)
Children's Hospice (CHSW), (Trowbridge) - subcontractor in Help to Work
Crystal Face (Bristol)
City Furnishings and Auction House (Glasgow) - withdrawn from Help to Work
Citizens Advice Bureau (CAB) - Work Programme
City and Guilds
City Furnishings (Glasgow) - defunct
City West Housing Trust (Greater Manchester)
Cineworld Cinemas
Claverhouse Training (Scotland) - defunct
Close Protection UK - defunct
Cloybank (Falkirk)
Clyde Valley Housing Association
Cornwall Neighbourhoods for Change - withdrawn from the Work Programme
Connect Community Trust (Scotland) - subcontractor in Help to Work
Cornelly and District Development Trust (Wales) - subcontractor in Help to Work
County Training (Shropshire)
Cre-namic Security - defunct
Crerar Hotels
Crest Co-operative (Wales) - subcontractor in Help to Work
Crossfold Electrical
Currys-PC World - involved in Traineeships
Cygnus Consulting Limited (East Midlands) - defunct
Daisy Chain Project (Stockton-on-Tees)
Daylight 
DB Accident Repair (Kent)
DC Cleaning  (Sussex)
Deaf Hub (Dundee) - subcontractor in Help to Work
Debenhams
The RAC (Bristol)
DebRA - subcontractor in Help to Work
de Poel Community (Knutsford, Cheshire)
Derbyshire & Nottinghamshire Chamber of Commerce - G4S subcontractor in Help to Work
Diamond Glass Medway (Kent)
DiSC Ltd, Developing initiatives Supporting Communities (North East) - Mandatory Work Activity
Divine Rescue - Mandatory Work Activity
Domus Healthcare
Doreen Hair Fashion Salon
Dorothy Perkins
Dove House Hospice (Hull and East Riding) - involved with Help to Work
Drayton Manor
Dulwich Hamlet FC - withdrawn
Dunelm Mill
Durham YFC
each (East Anglia Children's Hospice) - 'Community Work Placements'
e-achieve - defunct
eco-actif - defunct
ellenor charity (North & West Kent and Bexley)
Emmaus (Hull)
Employment Related Services Association (ERSA)
Enterprise Durham Partnership
Environmental Concern Co Ltd (Birmingham) - subcontractor in Help to Work
Envirostream - defunct
Escape Family Support (North East) - involved with Help to Work
esg Holdings Ltd (West Midlands) - Mandatory Work Activity
Essential Rubber
Evans
Experts in Media (Belfast) - defunct
Extra Time (Portslade)
Eyemouth Golf Club (Eyemouth, Scotland)
Fair Training & Recruitment Solutions Ltd - defunct
FARA Charity Shops
FareShare (Newcastle) - involved with 'Community Work Placements'
Faith Regen (East London)
Finsbury Park Business Forum
Finsbury and Clerkenwell Volunteers
FlutterBuys
First 4 Epos (Oldham) - defunct
First4Skills - defunct
FNTC Training & Consultancy - defunct
Focus Housing, Care, & Training Consultants Limited (Kent) - defunct
Fontaine Vinery (Guernsey) - subcontractor in Help to Work
Fort Amherst (Chatham) - subcontractor in Help to Work
FP Mailing (City) Ltd - defunct
Framework (Nottingham) - G4S subcontractor in Help to Work
French Oven Bakery (Newcastle upon Tyne)
F&S Interiors (Kent) - defunct
Furniture Matters (Morcambe)
Furniture Now (East Sussex) - 'Community Work Placements'
Furniture Plus (Kirkcaldy) - defunct
Furniture Revival (Rhymney)
Fusion Housing (Kirklees)
Gap Personnel 
Genesis Housing Association - subcontractor in Help to Work
The Genesis Trust (Bath) - subcontractor in Help to Work
Genistar
Gingerbread
Giroscope (Hull)
Glasgow Caring City - withdrawn from Help to Work
Global Placement Provider Ltd - defunct
Gnaw Chocolate (Norwich)
Goodwill Solutions (Northampton)
Gorgie City Farm
The Grand Venue (Clitheroe)
Green Futures (Grimsby) - subcontractor in Help to Work
Greggs the Bakers - Work Experience
Grosvenor Casinos (Brighton)
grow: Economic Regeneration & Development, Hull City Council - Mandatory Work Activity
Grow Enterprise Wales (RCT Homes) - subcontractor in Help to Work - defunct
Go Response (Kent)
Greenwich & Bexley Hospice
Grimsby Garden Centre
Groundwork - Mandatory Work Activity, also a "Prime" provider of Help to Work
Guinea Enviro (Glasgow) - subcontractor in Help to Work - defunct
GWK Shop - defunct
Hannah's (Dame Hannah Rogers Trust) (Devon)
Hairways
HANA (Humber All Nations Alliance)
Handel House Museum
Harriots
Hardens Cafe 
Haringey Voluntary Services
Harlow and District Chamber of Commerce
Haven House Children's Hospice
Hastings & Rother Voluntary Association for the Blind
Helen & Douglas House Hospice (Maidenhead)
HERIB, Hull and East Riding Institute for the Blind - involved with Help to Work
Helena Partnerships
HEY Mind (Hull)
HMRC
HMV - withdrawn
Highbury New Park Day Centre
Highgate Newtown Community Centre
Hilton Hotels
Hillhead Pets Corner (Kilbirnie)
Holiday Inn - claimed to have withdrawn in 2012, but remain involved with Sector-Based Work Academies as of 2014
Holland & Barrett - withdrawn
Homebase - withdrawn
Homes for Haringey - withdrawn from the Work Programme
Home-Start
Homes for Islington 
Hornsey School for Girls
Hospices of Hope - withdrawn from Help to Work
House of Hope Recycling Village (East Kilbride)
The Hull Council for Disabled People - involved with Help to Work
Hull Food Bank
Hull HARP, Homeless and Rootless Project - involved with Help to Work
Iceland - involved with Traineeships
Ideal Mobile Solutions - defunct
ICM (Global) - defunct
IKEA - involved with Traineeships
Ingeus UK - Mandatory Work Activity
Inspire 2 Independence Ltd (i2i) - defunct
Intelling
Interserve Doncaster - Work Programme
Invicta Foundation - withdrawn, had been involved with Help to Work
Ironworks (Scotland) - involved with Help to Work
Isabel Hospice (Hertfordshire)
Ixion (West London; East London) - G4S subcontractor in Help to Work
JTJ Workplace Solutions - defunct
Jacob's Well (Hull)
JA Glover – (Kent)
Jessup Electrical Wholesale Ltd (Kent)
JJ Vickers & Sons Ltd (Kent) - defunct
JH Cancer Support (Warrington, Cheshire)
JHP Group Ltd (Scotland) - Mandatory Work Activity  - defunct
JJ Training (North East Yorkshire & Humber) - G4S subcontractor in Help to Work - defunct
Job Point (Recruitment) Limited - defunct
Jurys Inn
Keech Hospice (Beds, Herts and Milton Keynes)
Kennedy Scott
Kent Flooring Supplies (Kent)
Kent Space – (Kent)
KEMP Hospice (Kidderminster, Worcesterhsire)
KFR Kennet Furniture Refurbiz (Devizes, Wiltshire)
Kidney Research UK
Kirkwood Hospice (Huddersfield)
Kingston Community Furniture
Kingdom Security
Kiln Park
Kiltro (UK) Ltd - defunct
Knutsford Town Council
K-10
Lakelands Hospice (Corby)
LAMH Recycle Ltd (Motherwell) - withdrawn from Help to Work
Learn About (Wales) - subcontractor in Help to Work
Learn Direct - Mandatory Work Activity, also a "Prime" provider for Help to Work, and a G4S subcontractor for East Midlands, Merseyside, Lancashire & Cumbria, and Hampshire, Thames Valley & Isle of Wight
Leightec Solutions  - defunct
Lincoln Hartford Solicitors 
Life Skills Central Ltd (Scotland) - Mandatory Work Activity
Light Project International
Livability
Liverpool Plastics - defunct
Loaves "n" Fishes (West Midlands) - Mandatory Work Activity
London Field Primary School 
Longhill Link Up Trust (Hull)
Lonsdale Community Centre (Hull)
Lloyds Bank – General Insurance
Lowestoft Town FC
Lower Morden Equestrian Centre
Luton Borough Council
Luton Culture
Macdonald Hotels (Scotland) - 'Traineeships'
Major Energy
MAS Landscapes
Marie Curie - withdrawn
Marks & Spencer
Marlborough House Mosque & Community Centre (Stockton on Tees) - Mandatory Work Activity
Marriott Hotels (Glasgow) - involved in Traineeships; have stated that they will not be participants in Help to Work
Martin House Hospice - involved with Help to Work
Maplin - withdrawn
Matalan
Matrix Complex 
Maxwell Centre (Dundee) - subcontractor in Help to Work
Mayhem Paintball
McDonald's
Mercy in Action (Bath, Bucks and Beds)
McSence (Scotland) - involved with Help to Work
Medex Accident Assistance Ltd - defunct
Medout 
Medway Council
Medway Tyres (Kent)
Mencap - Mandatory Work Activity; but have stated that they will not be participants in Help to Work
Melin Homes (South East Wales)
Michael Ambrose (Leicester) - involved with Traineeships
Merson Signs
Microcom Training Ltd (Scotland) - defunct
Midcounties Co-operative - subcontractor in Help to Work
Midlands Air Ambulance
Mid-Lin Day Care Centre (Dundee) - subcontractor in Help to Work
Mind - withdrew from Mandatory Work Activity in 2012, but remain involved with the Work Programme as of 2014; have stated that they will not be participants in Help to Work
Migrants Resource Centre 
Mitie Foundation
Montem Primary School
The Mustard Tree (Manchester) - withdrawn from Mandatory Work Activity
MTL Group - defunct
M-Valeting Ltd (King's Lynn) - involved with Traineeships - defunct
My Claim Solved
MS Society
Nandos (Edinburgh)
National Federation of Retail Newsagents (NFRN)
National Hereditary Breast Cancer (Hull) - subcontractor in Help to Work
Nationwide Event Support
NAViGO Health and Social Care CIC (Grimsby) - Mandatory Work Activity and Sector-Based Work Academies
Newham Council
Newhaven Community Development
Nico Manufacturing
Nightingale House (Wrexham)
Norfolk Trucks
North Doncaster Development Trust (NDDT) - Work Programme
North London Hospice - withdrawn from Help to Work; charity shops accepting "Community Work Placements" as of 2014
Northumberland County Council - Mandatory Work Activity
North Yorkshire Learning Consortium - Mandatory Work Activity
North Wales Training - subcontractor in Help to Work
Nova New Opportunities (Brighton)
99p - withdrawn
OAS (Oxfordshire Animal Sanctuary)
Ocado
Our Lady Kentish Town
Octavia Foundation (London) - involved in 'Community Work Placements'
Oldfield Consultancy Ltd - defunct 
Olympic Glass (Kent)
Omega Therapies CIC - defunct
Omnico Plastics Ltd (Kent)
1'O Clock Club Barnsbury
One World Shop (Hull)
Outfit
Our Lady Help of Christians (Farnborough)
Oxfam - withdrawn
Oxgangs Neighborhood Centre (Edinburgh) - involved with Help to Work
Papworth Trust - withdrawn from Mandatory Work Activity
Park Nature Reserve
Payless (Kent) - defunct
Pastures New (Littleborough) - involved with Help to Work
PATCH (Pembrokeshire Action To Combat Hardship) - involved with Help to Work
PDSA - withdrawn; have also stated that they will not be participants in Help to Work
Peacocks
Pera Training (Leicester) - involved in Traineeships
People Know How (Edinburgh)
Peter Bedford Housing Association
PHA Recruitment Solutions - defunct
Phoenix Enterprises (Yorkshire and the Humber) - subcontractor in Help to Work
Pinnacle People - Mandatory Work Activity; also G4S subcontractor in Help to Work in East Midlands, West London, and East London
Pizza Hut (Kent and Surrey) - withdrawn
Pioneer Social Enterprise Ltd (Doncaster) - subcontractor in Help to Work
Pilkington Glass
Plumbase (Kent)
Placement Provider Partners (Yorkshire & Humber) - Mandatory Work Activity
Plymouth County Council - involved with Help to Work
Salisbury Mews Haringes 
Sprigboard UK
Pramp 
Poppies Limited
Porchlight (Kent) - withdrawn
Portsmouth Council - subcontractor in Help to Work
Poundland - involved with the Work Programme, Sector-Based Work Academies, and Traineeships
Poundworld Retail
Poundstretcher
PPDG (Pertemps People Development Group) - G4S subcontractor in Help to Work
Premier Inn
Primark
Process Plant Services Ltd (Kent)
Pulse CIC
Pulteneytown Peoples Project (Scotland) - involved with Help to Work
Quality Savers
Radha-Krishna Temple
Radisson Edwardian - involved in Traineeships
Radecal Signs (Washington, Tyne and Wear) - subcontractor in Help to Work
The Range
Randstad - withdrawn
Rathbone Training - defunct
RBLI
Ready2Work
Rebound Bookshop (Blackburn) - involved with Help to Work
Recycle Force
Recyke-a-bike
Recycling Unlimited (Hull) - subcontractor in Help to Work
Red Cross - 'Traineeships'
Refurb project
Regency Guillotine (Kent)
Rehab JobFit (South West) - Mandatory Work Activity
Relate
Rerun (Hull)
Restore Community Project
Revive Leeds - involved with Help to Work
Revive, The Green House (Liverpool) - involved with Help to Work
Richmond Fellowship - withdrawn
rinascente (Stockport) - subcontractor in Help to Work
River Kids (Livingstone) - subcontractor in Help to Work
RNIB - Mandatory Work Activity, but have stated that they will not be participants in Help to Work
Robert Blaire Primary School 
The Rock Foundation (Grimsby) - subcontractor in Help to Work
Romney Resource (Kent)
Room 2 (Kirkcaldy) - subcontractor in Help to Work
Rotherham Council
Rowcroft Hospice (Torquay) - subcontractor in Help to Work
Royal Borough of Windsor and Maidenhead
Royal Mail
RNR Performance Cars (Kent)
RPQ Inns Ltd – The Grapes Hotels - defunct
RSPCA - Mandatory Work Activity and are involved in Traineeships
St Andrew's Children's Hospice (Hull) - withdrawn from "Community Work Placements" part of Help to Work
St Ann's Hospice, Manchester - involved with Help to Work
Saffron Acres Project
Sage UK
Sainsbury's - withdrawn from earlier versions of workfare, but now involved with Traineeships
Saint Francis Hospice (Havering-atte-Bower, Romford, Essex)
St Benedict's Hospice (Sunderland) - involved with Help to Work
St Davids Hospice (Wales) - involved with Help to Work
St Mungos - Broadway - withdrawn from the Work Programme
St Mungos - withdrawn; have also stated that they will not be participants in Help to Work
St Peters Hospice (Bristol)
St Luke's Hospice (Plymouth)
St Mary's Horse Refuge (Essex) - subcontractor in Help to Work
St Oswald's Hospice shops (Newcastle upon Tyne)
St Richard's Hospice (Worcestershire) - subcontractor in Help to Work
St Vincents Hospice (Howwood, Renfrewshire) - Mandatory Work Activity
St Vincent de Paul
St Werburghs City Farm, Bristol - withdrawn from Mandatory Work Activity
Salvation Army - Mandatory Work Activity, but have stated that they will not be participants in Help to Work
Sarina Russo Job Action - involved with Help to Work
Savers - Sector-Based Work Academies
Scarborough Council - withdrawn
Scope - withdrew from Mandatory Work Activity and the Work Programme in 2012, but remain involved with Work Experience as of 2014
Scottish Wildlife Trust - involved with Help to Work
Scout Enterprises
Sector Solutions (Yorkshire & Humber) - Mandatory Work Activity - defunct
Sedgemoor Furniture Store (Bridgwater, Somerset) - involved with Help to Work
Seetec - Mandatory Work Activity
Select Sandwich & Coffee Co - defunct
Sense - withdrew from Mandatory Work Activity in 2012, but remain involved with other variants of workfare as of 2014; have stated that they will not be participants in Help to Work
Serco
Servest
Shaw Trust - Mandatory Work Activity
Shelter - withdrawn
Shettleston Housing Association (Glasgow) - 'Community Work Placements'
SHOC Slough Homeless
Shoe Zone - withdrew from earlier versions of workfare, but now involved with Traineeships
Shropshire Council - Mandatory Work Activity
Square Orange Associates - defunct
Signs & Imaging Ltd - defunct
Simply Accountable - defunct
Single Homeless Project (SHP) - withdrawn
Sixhills Aquatics - defunct
Slough Library
Slough Furniture Project
Southend Storehouse - defunct
Southern Membranes Ltd (Kent) - defunct
Southern Metal Services (Kent)
Southern Roofing & Building Supplies (Kent)
South West Laundry
South Yorkshire Chambers of Commerce (Doncaster Chamber of Commerce) - Work Programme
Sports Traider - defunct
Spyglass & Kettle pub (Bournemouth)
Stag Treorchy
Starter Packs Magpie Tribe, Magpie's Eye Gallery, and The Magpie's Nest (Glasgow) - withdrawn from Help to Work
St. John's Street Library/Age Concern
St Luke's Hospice Shops 
St Mary Pre-School 
Stephens Fresh Food (Kent)
Store Twenty One - defunct
Stranraer Millennium Centre - Help to Work
Strategic Pro Office, Islington 
Studio 28 Light and Design 
Sunnyside Ecology Centre 
Storie Argyll Ltd
Subway (Newcastle)
Sue Ryder - withdrawn, but involved in Traineeships; have stated that they will not be participants in Help to Work
Sumo Waste (Glasgow) - involved with Help to Work
Sunderland North Community Business Centre - Mandatory Work Activity
Superdrug - withdrawn
Swan Lifeline (Windsor)
Tai Calon Community Housing (Blaenau Gwent) - involved with Help to Work
Tanya's Courage Trust - Supporting Young People with Cancer (Penzance) - Mandatory Work Activity
TAS Ltd (West London) - G4S subcontractor in Help to Work
Tate Recruitment
TBG Learning
Tesco - involved with "Work Experience" workfare variant, and Traineeships
Tenovus Cancer Care (Cardiff)
THAG (Tesside Homeless Action Group)
Think 3E Ltd - defunct
Thorpes Hub Ltd (Hull) - defunct
Thorn International UK Limited (Walsall) - defunct
Thornton Manor (Cheshire)
TCHC
Timbermills
TK Maxx - claimed to have withdrawn from workfare in January 2012, but involved in Sector-Based Work Academies as of 2014
Toni & Guy
Topman
Topshop
The Children's Society - withdrew from Mandatory Work Activity in 2012, but remain involved with other versions of workfare as of 2014; have stated that they will not be participants in Help to Work
The Crossings (Hull)
The Conservation Volunteers (TCV) - Mandatory Work Activity, but have stated that they will not be participants in Help to Work
The Lennox Partnership (Scotland) - Mandatory Work Activity
The Lettings Co (Leicester) - involved with "Traineeships"
The Princes's Trust - heavily involved in M&S's "branded" version of the "Work Experience" version of workfare aimed at young people; previously known to be a Work Programme sub-contractor
The Tell Organisation (Scotland) - Mandatory Work Activity
The Work Company (Hull) - G4S subcontractor in Help to Work
The Wishing Well Project Jubilee Centre (Crewe) - Mandatory Work Activity
Timpsons
Tiny Tots Nursery/HG Comm Centre
TMF Logistics (West Bromwich) - defunct
Tomorrow's People - Mandatory Work Activity - defunct
Town and Country Cleaners (Kent)
Trackwork Installations Limited- defunct
Travelodge
TRAC (The Recyclyed Assets Company) (Portsmouth) - involved with Help to Work
TRAID - withdrawn from Help to Work
Triage (Scotland)
Twin Valley Homes
Two Sisters Food Group (2SFG) (Leicester and Nottingham)
Ty Hafan Charity Shop (Wales) - withdrawn from Help to Work
Urban Futures (East London) - defunct
Vertegen Recycling (Wirral) - defunctVirgin Media - involved with Traineeships
Virgin Trains  - defunctThe Vine Project (Surrey) - Mandatory Work Activity - defunctVolunteer Centre Hammersmith
Vulcan Centre for Sporting Excellence Ltd (Hull) - defunctWakefield & District Health & Community Support Ltd (WDHC)
Waldorf College (Stroud) - involved with Help to Work
Wallis
Waste Savers (Newport) - involved with Help to Work
Waterstones - withdrawnWD Close & Sons
WEA - withdrawn from the Work Programme
Westward Pathfinder - defunctWorkers' Educational Association, Scotland - withdrawn from the Work Programme
WEPRE Villa Homecare
West London Reuse Centre (Shepherds Bush Housing Association)
Westmanor Property Services (Leicester) - involved with Traineeships
Westminster Volunteer Centre 
Westra Boarding Kennels (Dinas Powis, Vale of Glamorgan) - subcontractor in Help to Work
Welfare To Work Systems Ltd - defunctWestvic Enamellers (Kent)
Wetherspoons
WH Smith
Whitehead Ross (Wales) - defunctWhittington Hospital
Whittingtons
William Frost Gardening 
Wilkinsons
WISE Ability - Work Programme
World of Pets (Grimsby)
The Work Company (Work Solutions)
Workpays (East Midlands)
W&S Waste Management & Recycling Ltd (London) - defunctWorking Links - defunct'
Work Solutions (Merseyside, Lancashire & Cumbria; and North East Yorkshire & Humber)
The Works
Wyeth Security Services
YMCA - Mandatory Work Activity; have stated that they will not be participants in Help to Work, but involved in Traineeships
Yorkshire Linen Company

References

Workfare in the United Kingdom